Mark Skilling (born 6 October 1972) is a Scottish former professional footballer who played as a midfielder.

Career
Born in Irvine, Skilling played for Saltcoats Victoria, Kilmarnock, Stranraer and Cumnock Juniors.

References

1972 births
Living people
Scottish footballers
Saltcoats Victoria F.C. players
Kilmarnock F.C. players
Stranraer F.C. players
Cumnock Juniors F.C. players
Scottish Football League players
Association football midfielders
Scotland under-21 international footballers